Edward Lloyd Thomas (March 23, 1825 – March 8, 1898) was a Confederate brigadier general of infantry during the American Civil War from the state of Georgia. He was colonel of the 35th Georgia Infantry Regiment, which was assigned to Joseph R. Anderson's brigade, which became part of A.P. Hill's famed "Light Division." When Anderson left to take control of the Tredegar Iron Works in Richmond, Thomas was promoted to brigadier general to command the brigade. He retained this position for the rest of the war and was present at all of the major battles of the Army of Northern Virginia

Thomas was a graduate of Oxford College of Emory University and served in the Mexican–American War. He was an uncle to famed American Old West lawman Heck Thomas who helped bring down the Doolin Dalton Gang.

Early life
Thomas was born in Clarke County, Georgia, to Mary Thomas (née Hogue) and Edward Lloyd Thomas (surveyor) through whom he was descended from  Edmund Thomas of Glamorgan. Edward Lloyd Thomas was the youngest of eleven children. He was a graduate of Oxford College of Emory University and served in the Mexican–American War from May 1847 until August 1848 as a second lieutenant in an independent company of Georgia mounted men. Before serving he farmed in Whitfield County, Georgia. Three of his brothers were Confederate officers: Henry Philip (b. 1810) a colonel in the 16th Regiment of Georgia was killed in battle at Fort Sanders in Knoxville, Tennessee, in 1863; Lovick Pierce Thomas, I (1812–1878) captain and quartermaster of the 35th Georgia Infantry resigned in 1863 due to injury; Wesley Wailes (1820–1906) served as a major in Phillip's Legion of Cavalry.

Civil War
In October 1861, Thomas became colonel of the 35th Georgia Infantry. The regiment was attached to Brig. Gen Joseph R. Anderson's brigade, which was initially stationed in Georgia, but during the Peninsula Campaign was sent to the Richmond area to reinforce Joe Johnston's army. On May 27, 1862, the brigade was added to the newly created division of Maj. Gen A.P. Hill, soon to be known as the "Light Division". While commanding the regiment, Thomas suffered a minor wound at the Battle of Beaver Dam Creek (Mechanicsville) during the Seven Days Battles. Anderson was wounded at Glendale and afterwards resigned his commission to manage the Tredegar Iron Works in Richmond. Thomas then became permanent commander of the brigade and on November 1, he was promoted to brigadier general, participating in all of the major battles and campaigns fought by the Army of Northern Virginia.

When division commander William D. Pender was mortally wounded at Gettysburg, the two ranking brigade commanders left in the division were Thomas and James H. Lane. Although both had been promoted to brigadier general the same day (November 1, 1862), Lane had received his colonel's commission in September 1861, a month before Thomas had become a colonel, and thus Lane outranked him and assumed temporary command of the division. It has been suggested that as a Georgian, Thomas was not favored in a division with two North Carolina brigades. He remained in command of his brigade until the surrender at Appomattox.

Postbellum career
After the war, Thomas returned to Georgia and farmed in Newton County near Covington. In 1885, President Grover Cleveland appointed him to a position as a Special Agent of the Land Bureau in Kansas. Later he was made Indian Agent at the Sac and Fox Agency, Indian Territory, Oklahoma. After being in poor health for some time, Thomas died on March 8, 1898, in South McAlester, Indian Territory, and is buried in Kiowa, Oklahoma.

See also

 List of American Civil War generals (Confederate)

References

 Eicher, John H., and David J. Eicher, Civil War High Commands. Stanford: Stanford University Press, 2001. .
 Huff, Frederick Ware. Four Families: Winn, Thomas, Ware, Garrett of the Southern United States from 1600s to 1993. Kennesaw, GA: Frederick Ware Huff, 1993. .
 Sifakis, Stewart. Who Was Who in the Civil War. New York: Facts On File, 1988. .
 Warner, Ezra J. Generals in Gray: Lives of the Confederate Commanders. Baton Rouge: Louisiana State University Press, 1959. .

External links
 
  Short biography of Edward L. Thomas
  35th Georgia
   16th Georgia Infantry
  Phillips' Legion

1825 births
1898 deaths
People from Clarke County, Georgia
American people of Welsh descent
Confederate States Army brigadier generals
People of Georgia (U.S. state) in the American Civil War
American military personnel of the Mexican–American War
People from Newton County, Georgia
Emory College alumni